Edoardo Bruno (11 September 1928 - 16 September 2020) was an Italian film critic and film historian.

Life and career 
Born in Rome, Bruno graduated in law  at Sapienza University of Rome. He made his debut as a journalist and film critic in 1948, and collaborated with various magazines and newspapers, notably L'Avanti!, Schermi, Film.

In 1950 he founded the film critic journal Filmcritica, which he directed for 70 years and 700 issues. He collaborated with the Venice Film Festival, curing several retrospectives.  In 1969, he directed his first and only film, His Day of Glory. He served as professor of history of theatre and entertainment at the Universities of Palermo and Salerno, professor of film history and criticism at his alma mater and professor of film history at the University of Florence. He died on 16 September 2020, at the age of 92.

References

External links
 

1928 births
2020 deaths
People from Rome
Italian film critics 
Italian essayists
Italian film historians
Italian male journalists
Male essayists
20th-century Italian writers
20th-century Italian male writers
20th-century essayists
Sapienza University of Rome alumni
Academic staff of the Sapienza University of Rome 
Academic staff of the University of Palermo
Academic staff of the University of Salerno
Academic staff of the University of Florence